Steve Moss is an American multi-instrumentalist best recognized for his work with guitarist Joe Baiza and his involvement in the band Universal Congress Of. He has also collaborated frequently with jazz saxophonist Gary Thomas and has appeared on albums by Firehose and Public Enemy.

Discography 

Saccharine Trust

Universal Congress Of

Other appearances

References 

Living people
American jazz saxophonists
American male saxophonists
American punk rock saxophonists
Hardcore punk musicians
Post-hardcore musicians
Universal Congress Of members
21st-century American saxophonists
21st-century American male musicians
American male jazz musicians
Year of birth missing (living people)